Dang Sarak or Dangsarak or Dengesarak may refer to:
 Dang Sarak, Neka
 Dangsarak, Sari